The 2022 Challenger de Villa María was a professional tennis tournament played on clay courts. It was the first edition of the tournament which was part of the 2022 ATP Challenger Tour. It took place in Villa María, Argentina between 19 and 25 September 2022.

Singles main-draw entrants

Seeds

 1 Rankings are as of 12 September 2022.

Other entrants
The following players received wildcards into the singles main draw:
  Alex Barrena
  Lautaro Midón
  Juan Bautista Otegui

The following player received entry into the singles main draw as an alternate:
  Facundo Juárez

The following players received entry from the qualifying draw:
  Matías Franco Descotte
  Franco Emanuel Egea
  Alejo Lorenzo Lingua Lavallén
  Orlando Luz
  Ignacio Monzón
  Juan Pablo Paz

Champions

Singles

 Nicolás Kicker def.  Mariano Navone 7–5, 6–3.

Doubles

  Hernán Casanova /  Santiago Rodríguez Taverna def.  Facundo Juárez /  Ignacio Monzón 6–4, 6–3.

References

2022 ATP Challenger Tour
2022 in Argentine tennis
September 2022 sports events in Argentina